The 2019 Copa Chile (officially known as Copa Chile MTS 2019 due to its sponsorship), was the 40th edition of the Copa Chile, the country's national football cup tournament. Palestino were the defending champions, but were knocked out of the competition by Santiago Morning in the second round. Colo-Colo were the champions, defeating Universidad de Chile 2–1 in the final.

Format 
The 2019 Copa Chile was based on a system of direct elimination with double-legged ties, similar to the Copa del Rey. Clubs that were members of the Segunda División Profesional and ANFA were included in the competition, same as the previous edition, and played against the Primera B clubs for 16 berths to the second round, where the winners faced the 16 Primera División clubs which joined the competition in that round.

Prizes 
The champions of this edition (or the runners-up, if the champions had already qualified) were entitled to earn the right to compete in the 2020 Copa Libertadores, taking the Chile 4 berth, and also earned the right to play the 2020 Supercopa de Chile against the 2019 Campeonato Nacional champions.

Schedule

Teams 
48 clubs took part in this edition of the Copa Chile: 16 from the Primera División, 16 from the Primera B, 11 from the Segunda División Profesional and 5 invitees from the Tercera División A.

Primera A

 Audax Italiano
 Cobresal
 Colo-Colo
 Coquimbo Unido
 Curicó Unido
 Deportes Antofagasta
 Deportes Iquique
 Everton
 Huachipato
 O'Higgins
 Palestino
 Unión Española
 Unión La Calera
 Universidad Católica
 Universidad de Chile
 Universidad de Concepción

Primera B

 Barnechea
 Cobreloa
 Deportes Copiapó
 Deportes La Serena
 Deportes Melipilla
 Deportes Puerto Montt
 Deportes Santa Cruz
 Deportes Temuco
 Deportes Valdivia
 Magallanes
 Ñublense
 Rangers
 San Luis
 Santiago Morning
 Santiago Wanderers
 Unión San Felipe

Segunda División

 Colchagua
 Deportes Colina
 Deportes Recoleta
 Deportes Vallenar
 Fernández Vial
 General Velásquez
 Iberia
 Independiente (Cauquenes)
 Lautaro de Buin
 San Antonio Unido
 San Marcos de Arica

Tercera A

 Deportes Concepción
 Deportes Rengo
 Pilmahue
 Provincial Osorno
 Trasandino

Preliminary phases

First round
The pairings for the first round were announced by the ANFP on 14 March 2019. The 16 teams from the Segunda División and Tercera División A were drawn against the 16 Primera B teams, according to geographical and safety criteria. Unlike the previous edition, ties in this round were single-legged, with the team from the lower tier hosting the match. Matches in this round were played on 23 and 24 March 2019.

Second round
The 16 Primera División teams entered the competition at this stage, and were drawn against the 16 first round winners. In each tie, the team from the lower tier hosted the first leg. The pairings for the second round were announced by the ANFP on 8 May 2019, the first legs were played from 30 May to 9 June 2019 and the second legs were played from 5 June to 10 July 2019.

|}
Notes

First leg

Second leg

Bracket

Final phases

Round of 16 
The draw for the Round of 16 and subsequent phases was held on 14 June 2019. Starting from this round, the order of legs in each tie will depend on the number assigned to each second round winner, with the team with the highest number in each tie hosting the second leg. The first legs were played on 13–14 and 16 July 2019, and the second legs were played on 20–21 July, 7 August, and 4 September 2019. 

|}

First leg

Second leg

Quarterfinals 

|}

First leg

Second leg

Semifinals 
With the ANFP's Council of Presidents voting to conclude the 2019 season on 29 November 2019, it was decided that both the semifinals and final would be single-legged series to be played in January 2020.

Final

References 

Chile
2019
Copa Chile